Lhasa City may refer to:

Lhasa (prefecture-level city), a prefecture-level city in the Tibet Autonomous Region of China, sometimes referred to as Lhasa City
Lhasa, an urban district and settlement in the Lhasa prefecture-level city